Carlton Chester "Cookie" Gilchrist (May 25, 1935 – January 10, 2011) was an American football player who played professionally in the American Football League (AFL) and Canadian Football League (CFL). Despite never playing in the NFL, Gilchrist was well known for his prolific tenures in high school football, the CFL, and the AFL.

Career
A star player at Har-Brack High School in Natrona Heights, Pennsylvania, in 1953 he led the team to the W.P.I.A.L. co-championship with Donora. As a junior, he was talked into signing a professional football contract with the NFL's Cleveland Browns by Paul Brown.  The signing was against NFL rules and likely illegal, and when Brown reneged on his promise that Gilchrist would make the team, Gilchrist left training camp at Hiram College, in Hiram, Ohio, and went to Canada to play. There, in the Ontario Rugby Football Union (ORFU), he received the Jim Shanks (Team MVP) Trophy for the Sarnia Imperials in 1954, and the Kitchener-Waterloo Dutchmen's Team MVP Award in 1955.

In 1956, he joined the Canadian Football League (CFL) with the Hamilton Tiger-Cats, helping lead them to a 1957 Grey Cup victory. He spent one season with the Saskatchewan Roughriders, rushing for 1,254 yards. He then was traded to the Toronto Argonauts for Tex Schwierer, and played three years in Toronto.  In his six years in the CFL, Gilchrist was a divisional All-Star at running back five consecutive years from 1956 to 1960 (there were no All-Canadians selected in those years) and was also an Eastern All-Star at linebacker in 1960.  Additionally, in 1960 he was runner up for the CFL's Most Outstanding Player Award. In his CFL career, Gilchrist recorded 4,911 rushing yards, 1,068 receiving yards and 12 interceptions.

Gilchrist then joined the roster of the Buffalo Bills of the fledgling American Football League.  Incidentally, Gilchrist was Buffalo's backup plan: they had actually drafted Ernie Davis to be the team's franchise running back in 1962. Davis instead chose the NFL, but died of leukemia before ever playing a down of professional football. The Bills instead signed Gilchrist as a free agent. While with Buffalo, Gilchrist played fullback and kicked, though he insisted he could have played both ways. He was the first 1,000-yard American Football League rusher, with 1,096 yards in a 14-game schedule in 1962. That year, he set the all-time AFL record for touchdowns with 13, and he earned AFL MVP honors.  Gilchrist rushed for a professional football record 243 yards and five touchdowns in a single game against the New York Jets in 1963. Though he was with the Bills for only three years (1962–1964), he remains the team's ninth-leading rusher all-time, and led the league in scoring in each of his three years as a Bill. Gilchrist ran for 122 yards in the Bills' 1964 American Football League championship defeat of the San Diego Chargers, 20–7. His 4.5 yard/rush average is second as a Bill only to O.J. Simpson. One of Gilchrist's strengths was blocking. Gilchrist's blocking was mentioned by broadcaster and ex-coach John Madden during a CBS TV broadcast in the 1987 season, saying "Cookie Gilchrist may have been the best blocking running back that ever played the game."

Gilchrist was a devastating runner. He ran with high knees and did not avoid contact. Many a defensive safety were left stretched out on the field after trying to tackle him.

In an early civil rights victory for black athletes, Gilchrist led a successful boycott of New Orleans as the site of the 1965 American Football League All-Star game. He is the only athlete to turn down being enshrined into the Canadian Football Hall of Fame and Museum, because of what he described as racism and exploitation by management. However, Gilchrist had stated before his death that he never turned down the Hall, instead stating that it was "not that simple". When he was informed about being nominated by the Hall by John Agro (counsel for the Canadian Football League Players Association), he was told to be "nice" to Jake Gaudaur, the CFL commissioner, and Gilchrist stated that he would "take it under advisement" due to his strained relations with Gaudaur while also expressing the belief that Canada had treated him as a "persona non grata" from 1956 to 2010. 

Gilchrist frequently was at odds with team management. He told a reporter from the London Free Press that most of the problems he encountered were a result of his standing up for principles at a time when black athletes were expected to remain silent.

Gilchrist was traded to the Denver Broncos before the 1965 season in exchange for fullback Billy Joe and cash.
He played for the Broncos in 1965 and 1967, and for the Miami Dolphins in 1966. He was sent to the man who started his career, Paul Brown in the Cincinnati Bengals expansion draft in 1968, but retired because of knee problems. He was an American Football League All-Star in 1962, 1963, 1964 and 1965, making him one of only a few professional football players who made their league's All-Star team for 10 consecutive years (six in the CFL, and four in the AFL). Gilchrist was selected as the fullback of the All-Time American Football League Team. The Professional Football Researchers Association named Gilchrist to the PRFA Hall of Very Good Class of 2013

Gilchrist was named to the Bills' Wall of Fame during the team's home game on October 29, 2017, against the Oakland Raiders.

Career regular season statistics

After football

In 1974, Gilchrist founded the United Athletes Coalition of America to help former football players adjust to life after retirement. In 1975, he booked Marvin Gaye, Ike & Tina Turner, and Taveres for a benefit concert at Maple Leaf Gardens in Toronto.

Gilchrist had numerous feuds with the people he worked with during his football career. He refused entry into the Canadian Football Hall of Fame because he did not believe he was paid well enough for his service. He also refused to accept enshrinement on the Buffalo Bills Wall of Fame because he wanted payment for appearing; Van Miller eventually convinced Gilchrist to change his mind, but Gilchrist was not inducted prior to his death. Gilchrist was posthumously inducted into the Greater Buffalo Sports Hall of Fame in 2011. Gilchrist did accept induction onto the Bills' Wall of Honor, the predecessor to the Wall of Fame that had been set up at War Memorial Stadium in 1970, but none of the honorees on that wall were carried over to Rich Stadium when it was built in 1973. On August 30, 2017, the Bills announced that he would be inducted into the Buffalo Bills Wall of Fame.

In an article in The Buffalo News on March 18, 2007, Gilchrist, then 71, announced that he was being treated for throat cancer. At the time, he lived in Natrona Heights, Pennsylvania.

On January 10, 2011, Gilchrist died at an assisted living facility in Pittsburgh, Pennsylvania. Gilchrist was posthumously diagnosed with stage four chronic traumatic encephalopathy, which may explain, in part, some of his behavioural difficulties. Gilchrist was aware of the possibility that he had the disease when writing his autobiography, The Cookie That Did Not Crumble, along with Chris Garbarino. Consequently, he donated his brain to the Canadian Sports Concussion Project for use in their study of CTE.

Personal life

Honors
First American Football League player to gain over 1,000 yards in a season (14 games, 1,096 yards in 1962)
Previously held the American professional football record for most yards rushing in a game, 243 yards vs. the New York Jets, on December 8, 1963.
His number 34 has been officially retired by the Buffalo Bills, to honor both him and Thurman Thomas, who also wore the number.
Honored by the Professional Football Researchers Association's "Hall of Very Good," a collection of outstanding professional football players not in the Pro Football Hall of Fame, as part of its 2013 class.
Buffalo Bills Wall of Fame.

See also 
 List of American Football League players

References

External links
 —maintained by the Gilchrist family
 Cookie Gilchrist's CFL statistics
 

1935 births
2011 deaths
People from Brackenridge, Pennsylvania
African-American players of Canadian football
American Football League All-Star players
American Football League All-Time Team
American Football League Most Valuable Players
American Football League rushing leaders
American football players with chronic traumatic encephalopathy
American football running backs
Buffalo Bills players
Canadian football running backs
Denver Broncos (AFL) players
Hamilton Tiger-Cats players
Miami Dolphins players
Ontario Rugby Football Union players
Players of American football from Pennsylvania
Sarnia Imperials players
Saskatchewan Roughriders players
Toronto Argonauts players
American Football League players
Deaths from esophageal cancer
Deaths from cancer in Pennsylvania
20th-century African-American sportspeople
21st-century African-American people